The 2010 Senior Bowl was an all-star college football exhibition game featuring players from the 2009 college football season, and prospects for the 2010 Draft of the professional National Football League (NFL), as well as for the United Football League's inaugural draft.

The 61st edition of the Senior Bowl was played on January 30, 2010, at 3 p.m. local time at Ladd–Peebles Stadium in Mobile, Alabama. Coverage of the event was in high-definition on the NFL Network. Clothing company Under Armour sponsored the event for the fourth consecutive year and provided apparel for the game. The North team won, 31–13.

Scoring summary

Coaching staff

North Team

South Team

Rosters
Mardy Gilyard Won Offensive MVP in Senior Bowl.

North Team

South Team

References

Senior Bowl
Senior Bowl
Senior Bowl
Senior Bowl